Coleophora hemerobiola is a moth of the family Coleophoridae. It is found in Turkestan.

The larvae feed on Malus, Pyrus, Crataegus and Prunus species. They feed on the leaves of their host plant.

References

hemerobiola
Moths described in 1926
Moths of Asia